Logan French Kensing (born July 3, 1982) is a former American professional baseball pitcher. He previously played in Major League Baseball (MLB) for the Florida Marlins, Washington Nationals, Colorado Rockies, Seattle Mariners and Detroit Tigers.

Playing career

Florida Marlins
Kensing was drafted by the Florida Marlins in the 2nd round of the 2003 Major League Baseball draft out of Texas A&M University.

Kensing made his Major League Baseball debut on September 10, .

Washington Nationals
After being designated for assignment by the Marlins, Kensing was traded to Washington for Kyle Gunderson on April 29, 2009. In August 2009, the Nationals designated him for assignment again.

On December 15, 2009, Kensing was re-signed by the Nationals with an invite to spring training. On March 17, 2010, the Nationals released Kensing.

Minor league stints
Kensing signed a minor league contract with the Tampa Bay Rays on April 9, 2010. However, he was forced to undergo two shoulder surgeries during the season and missed the whole year.

After beginning the 2011 season with the Bridgeport Bluefish of the independent Atlantic League, Kensing signed a minor league contract with the New York Yankees on June 29.

On January 4, 2012, Kensing signed a minor league contract with the Pittsburgh Pirates. In November 2012, Kensing elected free agency.

Colorado Rockies
Kensing was called up by the Colorado Rockies from the Triple-A Colorado Springs Sky Sox on June 16, 2013, and made his Rockies debut on June 19 against the Toronto Blue Jays. He was designated for assignment on June 21, 2013. He became a free agent on October 1.

Seattle Mariners
Kensing signed a minor league deal with the Seattle Mariners on January 17, 2014. He was called up from the Triple-A Tacoma Rainiers on August 23, 2015. For the first time since October 4, 2011, Kensing got the win against the Houston Astros on September 1. He pitched a scoreless seventh. Kensing was released by the Mariners after the season. During the 2015 season, Kensing appeared in 19 games for the Mariners, where he compiled a 2–1 record with a 5.87 ERA. He had 13 strikeouts in 15 innings pitched.

Detroit Tigers
On December 23, 2015, Kensing signed a minor league contract with the Detroit Tigers, and was invited to spring training. After a solid spring training (2.61 ERA in  innings) and injuries to Alex Wilson and Blaine Hardy, Kensing was added to the Detroit Tigers major league roster to start the 2016 season. He was designated for assignment on April 18, 2016, when they activated Blaine Hardy from the 15-day DL. He was sent outright to the Toledo Mud Hens two days later. He signed a new minor league contract for the 2017 season in November 2016. He elected free agency on November 6, 2017.

Somerset Patriots
On March 26, 2018, Kensing signed with the Somerset Patriots of the Atlantic League of Professional Baseball. He became a free agent following the 2018 season.

References

External links

1982 births
Living people
Baseball players from San Antonio
Florida Marlins players
Washington Nationals players
Colorado Rockies players
Seattle Mariners players
Detroit Tigers players
Major League Baseball pitchers
Texas A&M Aggies baseball players
Jamestown Jammers players
Greensboro Bats players
Jupiter Hammerheads players
Carolina Mudcats players
Gulf Coast Marlins players
Albuquerque Isotopes players
Syracuse Chiefs players
Bridgeport Bluefish players
Bradenton Marauders players
Scranton/Wilkes-Barre Yankees players
Altoona Curve players
Indianapolis Indians players
Colorado Springs Sky Sox players
Tacoma Rainiers players
Toledo Mud Hens players
Somerset Patriots players